Circle is a collaborative studio album by Boom Bip & Doseone. It was originally released via Mush Records on August 1, 2000. In Europe, it was re-released via The Leaf Label on May 27, 2002.

Critical reception

Kingsley Marshall of AllMusic gave the album 4.5 stars out of 5, saying, "Boom's otherworldly production and sense of the epic match the rapid-fire delivery of Dose blow for blow -- though occasionally the lyrics come so quickly that lines have to be spun simultaneously through different speakers." Thomas Quinlan of Exclaim! called it "one of the greatest contemporary hip-hop albums".

The New York Times included it on the year-end "Worthwhile Albums Most People Missed" list.

In 2010, Ali Maloney of The Skinny described the album as "a critical textbook for anyone with delusions of performance poetry." In 2011, Black Gillespie of Impose said, "Circle remains one of the most daring and challenging records from the early Aughts, predating Anticon's 'advanced hip hop' era."

Track listing

Personnel
Credits adapted from liner notes.

 Boom Bip – performance, production
 Doseone – performance, production
 Robert Curcio – additional production
 Tony Franklin – drums (19)
 Tony Luensman – alternative instrumentation (21)
 Mark Fox – puppets
 Hiro Matsuo – photography

References

External links
 
 

2000 albums
Boom Bip albums
Doseone albums
Mush Records albums
The Leaf Label albums
Collaborative albums